Avraham Oz (born May 23, 1944) is an Israeli Professor Emeritus of Theatre  and Hebrew and Comparative literature at the University of Haifa, a translator of plays, operas, and poetry into Hebrew, and a peace activist.  He specializes in English theatre and drama, Shakespeare, political theatre, and Theatre theory.

Personal history
Avraham Oz was born 23 May 1944 in Tel Aviv, Israel, and is married to Israeli theatre designer and translator Tal Itzhaki, director of the Academy of Performing Arts, Tel Aviv.

Educational background
He earned a B.A. in English literature and theatre arts (1967) and a M.A. in English literature (1970) from Tel Aviv University and a Ph.D. in English literature (1980) from the University of Bristol.

Career
He has taught at the University of Haifa, Tel Aviv University, and the Beit Zvi School of Dramatic Art; Hakibbutzim Seminar College and Sapir Academic College, and as a visiting lecturer at The Hebrew University of Jerusalem and The University of Delaware.  He also served for many years as an associate artistic director at The Cameri Theatre, and dramaturg at the Haifa Municipal Theatre. In 2010 he was a founding member of the Academy of Performing Arts, Tel Aviv, which combines professional training with studies towards a BA degree in cooperation with the Israeli Open University. He serves there as a Professor of Theatre and a Stage director.

From 1982 to 1986, he served as the Head of the Department of Theatre Arts, Tel Aviv University. In 1984 he founded and edited Assaph: Theatre Studies published by Tel Aviv University; in 1994 he founded the Department of Theatre at the University of Haifa and served as its first chairman, and in 1995 he founded and edited JTD: Journal of Theatre and Drama, published by the University of Haifa.  From 2000 until its closure in 2004, he served as the director of the Haifa University Theatre.  In 2007 he founded Mofa, an electronic journal for theatre and the performing arts, and he serves as its editor.

Oz is also the general editor of the Hebrew edition (single volume series) of the works of Shakespeare, of which 20 volumes are already published; and served as the president of the Israeli Association for Theatre Research (IATR).

Oz directed several stage plays, among them Shakespeare's The Merchant of Venice and Henry V, Harold Pinter's Ashes to Ashes, Mountain Language, and Landscape; C. P. Taylor's Good, and his own play "Glorious Mountain". He is a resident director at the Alfa Theatre in Tel Aviv. His play "Glorious Mountain" (2021) is a historical fantasy on the first immigration to Palestine at the end of the 19th century and the birth of Zionism. His play "Pipes" (2023) depicts the Assassination of Dr Jacob Israel De Haan, the first political murder by Jews in moern Palestine.

Among his many Hebrew translations of plays and operas, commissioned and performed by all major theatre companies in Israel and The New Israeli Opera, are: Shakespeare's The Merchant of Venice, As You Like It, Coriolanus, Romeo and Juliet, The Tempest, King Lear, Julius Caesar, Henry V, and A Midsummer Night's Dream; Bertolt Brecht's Life of Galileo, The Wedding, Arturo Ui, Three Penny Opera, and the opera The Rise and Fall of the City Mahagonny; Harold Pinter's The Homecoming, Betrayal, Landscape, Silence, One for the Road, Ashes to Ashes, The New World Order, Party Time, and Mountain Language; C. P. Taylor's Good by C. P. Taylor; Engelbert Humperdinck's 1983 opera Hänsel und Gretel; Wild Honey, an untitled work by Anton Chekhov adapted by Michael Frayn; and Agamemnon, by Aeschylus, as adapted by Steven Berkoff; and Peter Turrini's Figaro.

Selected books
Author
Shetar hi-hidah (The Riddle Bond: Studies in The Merchant of Venice) Tel Aviv: Hakibutz Hameuchad, 1990.  (In Hebrew).
The Yoke of Love: Prophetic Riddles in "The Merchant of Venice" (Newark, London and Toronto: University of Delaware Press, 1995.   (10).   (13).
ha-Te'atron ha-politi : hasva'ah, meha'ah, nevu'ah (Political Theatre).  Tel Aviv: Dvir/Haifa University Press, 1999.  (In Hebrew).
ha-Yetsirah ha-Sheḳspirit (Shakespeare). Tel Aviv : Miśrad ha-biṭaḥon, 2006.  (In Hebrew.)
Sadot u-Mizvadot: Tesot al Hadrama ha-Ivrit ve-Hasiper ha-Zioni (Fields and Luggage: Theses on Hebrew Drama and the Zionist Narrative). Tel Aviv : Resling, 2014.  (In Hebrew.)
Editor
Strands Afar Remote: Israeli Perspectives on Shakespeare.  International Studies in Shakespeare and His Contemporaries ser.  Wilmington, DE: U of Delaware P, 1998.   (10).   (13).
Marlowe.  New Casebooks ser.  New York and London: Palgrave Macmillan, 2003.   (10).   (13).
[with Susan Haedicke, Deirdre Heddon, and E.J. Westlake]  Political Performances: Theory and Practice. New York and Amsterdam: Rodopi, 2009.

Related activities
Oz was a theatre critic for two of the major daily papers in Israel (Lamerhav, and later Ha'aretz) as well as on the Israeli National Radio; was a theatre editor for the literary magazine Akhshav (1968–1973), had a weekly show on theatre on the Israeli National Radio (1968–1971), and edited and presented several TV series on Theatre and Shakespeare.

Peace activism
Oz is an internationally known peace activist in Israel.  He is a founding member of the Committee for Solidarity with Birzeit University and the Committee Against the War in Lebanon.  He has organized, spoken, and written extensively on subjects relating to achieving peace in the Middle East and ending the Israeli occupation of the Palestinian territories.  In the spring of 2005, in a letter opposing a proposed UK academic boycott of Israeli universities, including his home institution the University of Haifa and Birzeit University, he stated: "Whenever asked, over the last few years I expressed my opinion that even though the repressive policies of my country [Israel] against the Palestinian population, especially in the territories occupied in 1967, is appalling, racist, sometimes horrifying in its cruelty, and often having crossed the boundaries of war crimes, academic boycott was neither morally justified nor effective." In the official biography of the Late Nobel Prize laureate Harold Pinter by Michael Billington, the famous playwright is quoted as having written, in 2005, to Professor Avraham Oz: "Let's keep fighting!".

Notes

External links
"Avraham Oz" – Biography in the Bio-Bibliographical Lexicon of Modern Hebrew Literature (in Hebrew).
The Committee Against the War in Lebanon – Official website.
Committee for Solidarity with Bir Zeit University – Official website.
Faculty for Israeli-Palestinian Peace – UK – Official website; hyperlinks ("Past Events": 1b: "The AUT boycott debate" April – May 2005).
"The Israeli Association for Theatre Research (IATR): 2006 annual meeting Thursday, 2 March 2006 Israel," article about the Israeli Association for Theatre Research (IATR), by Avraham Oz, in "News: Conferences & Symposiums," All About Jewish Theatre, Jewish-theatre.com.
"Professor Avraham Oz" – Associate Professor, Department of Theatre, University of Haifa, Faculty member webpage (in English); hyperlinked Curriculum vitae.

1944 births
Living people
People from Tel Aviv
Israeli theatre directors
Israeli male dramatists and playwrights
Academic staff of the University of Haifa
Academic staff of Sapir Academic College